Emilio José Gutiérrez González (born 4 January 1971 in Avilés, Asturias), sometimes known as just Emilio, is a Spanish retired footballer who played as a midfielder.

External links
 
 Real Avilés profile 
 

1971 births
Living people
People from Avilés
Spanish footballers
Footballers from Asturias
Association football midfielders
La Liga players
Segunda División players
Segunda División B players
Tercera División players
Real Avilés CF footballers
FC Barcelona Atlètic players
FC Barcelona players
Sporting de Gijón players
Albacete Balompié players
CA Marbella footballers
Málaga CF players
Cultural Leonesa footballers
CE Sabadell FC footballers
Terrassa FC footballers
UP Langreo footballers
S.C. Beira-Mar players
Spain youth international footballers
Spain under-21 international footballers
Spain under-23 international footballers
Spanish expatriate footballers
Expatriate footballers in Portugal